Cherokee Inc., also known as Apex Global Brands, is an American based global apparel and footwear company, headquartered in Sherman Oaks, California. The company was established in 1973 and its brands are available in 110 countries in 12,000 retail locations and on digital commerce.

Cherokee owns a number of fashion and lifestyle brands, including: Cherokee, Cherokee Workwear, Carole Little, Tony Hawk Signature Apparel and Hawk Brands, 900 Tony Hawk, Liz Lange, Sideout, Hi-Tec, Magnum, 50 Peaks, Interceptor, Everyday California, Point Cove, Saint Tropez, Chorus Line, All That Jazz, Ale by Allesandra, Teen Hearts and Flip Flop Shops.

History

Founding
In 1973, James Argyropoulos, the son of a Greek immigrant, launched custom-made footwear designs and began to sell them from his Venice Beach, California home. Soon it was stocked by department stores, including Macy's and Bloomingdale's.

In the early 1980s, the brand expanded to selling women's and children's apparel. During this time, it became available worldwide.

In the 1990s, Cherokee established a partnership with Target.

The headquarters at Sherman Oaks, California employs 51-200 employees.

In 2021, Apex Global Brands was acquired by Galaxy Universal.

Filing for bankruptcy protection
It filed for Chapter 11 bankruptcy protection in both 1993 and 1994, but continued to trade.

Expansion

In 1997, it acquired Sideout.

From 2002, Cherokee was sold at Tesco in the United Kingdom until 2015, when Argos took over the rights to sell the brand. However, following the 2016 acquisition of Argos by the UK retailer Sainsbury's, the Cherokee brand was quietly dropped and replaced by Sainsbury's own Tu brand of clothing in 2017.

In December 2002, the company further expanded by acquiring the Carole Little, Saint Tropez, All That Jazz and Chorus Line brands and CL Fashion trademarks.

From 2013 to 2015 Cherokee was sold at Target Canada stores and was acquired by Sears Canada. Prior to Target, the label was sold by Zellers in Canada since 1998.

In January 2014, Cherokee acquired the worldwide Tony Hawk and Hawk signature apparel brands.  In May 2015, Cherokee acquired casual lifestyle brand Everyday California.

On September 10, 2015, Cherokee announced Target would cease carrying the brand when its license expires on January 31, 2017. As of 2022 some Target shops do carry Cherokee products but on a non exclusive basis.

In October 2015, Cherokee acquired Flip Flop Shops, a franchise retail chain offering flip flops, casual footwear and accessories.

In November 2016, Cherokee acquired the Hi-Tec and Magnum brands.

Operations

Cherokee comprises a number of fashion and lifestyle brands:

Cherokee
Cherokee is the core eponymous brand, licensed in over 50 countries.

Cherokee Workwear 
Cherokee Workwear is a brand that was introduced in 2004, which manufactures medical scrubs.

Carole Little
The Carole Little collection comprises items for work, travel and leisure.

Tony Hawk Signature Apparel and Hawk Brands
Tony Hawk is an "action lifestyle" range.

900 Tony Hawk
900 Tony Hawk is a skateboard brand.

Liz Lange
Liz Lange is a maternity wear brand.

Sideout
Sideout was founded in 1983 and comprises athletic wear, sportswear and active wear.

Hi-Tec
Hi-Tec is a privately held producer and distributor of sportswear and accessories, headquartered in the Netherlands.

Magnum
Magnum is a footwear brand.

50 Peaks
50 Peaks is a brand which creates outdoor footwear, equipment and apparel.

Interceptor
Interceptor is a tactical boots brand.

Everyday California
Everyday California is a "casual style outfit" brand.

Point Cove
Point Cove is a Californian brand which sells clothing, footwear and accessories.

Saint Tropez
Saint Tropez is designed for younger women.

Chorus Line
Founded in 1975 by three men in southern California, Chorus Line is a moderately priced apparel company which initially begun as a retail company focusing exclusively on juniors collections. Chorus Line has branched out to include designs specifically aimed towards women in their 20s and 30s as well as petite and plus size divisions.

All That Jazz
All That Jazz appeals to a teenage female customer base and with low prices.

Flip Flop Shops
Flip Flop Shops was founded in 2004 and is a retail chain retailing popular brands and flip flops and casual footwear.

See also
Hi-Tec
Tony Hawk
Liz Lange

References

Clothing brands of the United States
Clothing companies established in 1973
1990s fashion
2000s fashion
2010s fashion
Companies listed on the Nasdaq
Companies based in Los Angeles
1973 establishments in California